Carla Soledad "Calu" Rivero (born 5 April 1987) is an Argentine actress and model.

Early life
Carla Soledad Rivero was born in Recreo, Catamarca. She moved with her family to Córdoba at the age of six. Her nickname "Calu" was given by her older sister because of a character called Kalú in the Chilean telenovela Tic tac.

Career

Early work (2006–2007)
Having finished secondary school, Rivero began studying dramatic arts in the National University of Córdoba. Being passionate about clothes, she hosted a television show about fashion until she was 19.

In 2006 Rivero moved to Buenos Aires to pursue her acting career and began taking drama classes with Norman Briski. In 2007 she was called for temporary works as an extra in Son de Fierro and Lalola.

Breakthrough (2007-2011)
Rivero's breakthrough television role was in Patito feo in August 2007 where she was cast as the villain. The character was popular and as a result, Rivero started gaining a following. She was the first actress from Catamarca to appear on national television. Because of this, she was named Illustrious Citizen of Recreo.

She also appeared in television shows such as Atrapados, Champs 12, Casi ángeles and Alguien que me quiera.
Rivero's modeling career boomed, being the face of both national and international companies such as Nike, TOMS Shoes, Agatha Ruíz de la Padra, La Casa de las Botas, Sweet Victorian, Todo Moda, 47 Street and Roho.

2011–present
In early 2011, Rivero was called to be part of El elegido, with Pablo Echarri. Her role gave her critical acclaim. In February, Rivero designed her own winter collection for the Argentine fashion Complot.

In mid-2011, Rivero starred in the music video for "Please Me" by the Argentine band Poncho. The song was very successful in Argentina, considered the summer hit of 2012. This fact heightened Rivero's popularity.

By the end of 2011, Calu Rivero became one of the most sought-after actresses in Argentina, considered the new national "It girl" and a fashion icon.

In 2012 she joined the cast of the telenovela Dulce Amor airing in Telefe.

In 2013, Rivero made her film debut in Tesis sobre un homicidio by Hernán Goldfrid. The film was a success, and led the box office for weeks.

Personal life
Rivero lives in New York City and in late 2019 adopted the name Dignity. She practices Gaga dance.

Filmography

Films

Television

Awards

Nominations
 2013 Martín Fierro Awards
 Best actress of daily comedy (for Mis amigos de siempre)

References

1987 births
21st-century Argentine actresses
Argentine female models
Argentine film actresses
Argentine television actresses
Living people
People from Catamarca Province